Christian Beaulieu is a Canadian biomedical engineer, currently a Canada Research Chair at University of Alberta.

References

External links
CV

Year of birth missing (living people)
Living people
Academic staff of the University of Alberta
Canadian engineers